William Layton (by 1514 – 1551 or 1552), of Harrow, Middlesex, was an English politician.

He was a Member (MP) of the Parliament of England for Lichfield in 1547.

References

1550s deaths
People from Harrow, London
English MPs 1547–1552
Year of birth uncertain